LDAC may refer to:

Science and technology
 LDAC (codec), an audio codec used in Bluetooth
 Linz-Donawitz-Arbed-Centre-National method (LDAC method), at the Minière et Métallurgique de Rodange

Organisations
 Learning Disabilities Association of Canada, an association in support of children with learning disabilities
 Long Distance Advisory Council, of the European Fisheries Control Agency
 Land and Building Advisory Committee, in North East New Territories New Development Areas Planning, Hong Kong

Other uses
 Leader Development and Assessment Course, of the US Army's Reserve Officers' Training Corps
 Letterman Digital Arts Center, San Francisco, US